Max Yavno (1911–1985) was a photographer who specialized in street scenes, especially in Los Angeles and San Francisco, California.

Personal life

The son of Russian immigrants, Louis and "Lizzie" (Rudnick) Yavno, Max was born in New York City on 26 April 1911. He had a brother, Emil, and a sister, Ethel. Yavno was married to Annie Abramsky at age 19 and divorced three years later. He died in Los Angeles on 4 April 1985 of complications resulting from a fall in a shower.

Professional life

Yavno worked as a Wall Street messenger while attending City College of New York at night. He attended the graduate school of political economics at Columbia University and worked in the Stock Exchange before becoming a social worker in 1935. He did photography for the Works Progress Administration from 1936 to 1942. He was president of the Photo League in 1938 and 1939. Yavno was in the U.S. Army Air Corps from 1942 to 1945, after which he moved to San Francisco and began specializing in urban-landscape photography. History professor Constance B. Schulz said of him:

For financial reasons he worked as a commercial advertising photographer for the next twenty years (1954–75), creating finely crafted still lifes that appeared in Vogue and Harper's Bazaar. He returned to artistic landscape photography in the 1970s, when his introspective approach found a more appreciative audience. Funding from the National Endowment for the Arts enabled him to travel to Egypt and Israel in 1979.

He also captured a pre-Dodgers Chavez Ravine, a giant plaster leg on top of a building in West Los Angeles and a "nostalgic" shot of a cable car being turned around at Powell and Market streets in San Francisco.

His noted photograph of a crowd watching "sun-worshipping body builders at Muscle Beach in Venice" sold at auction in 1984 for almost $4,000.  He said he had spent three Sundays at the beach before the subjects "stopped flexing for his camera and resumed posing for each other." His obituary in the Los Angeles Times said that:

Melrose Avenue photo gallery owner G. Ray Hawkins, who represented Yavno and exhibited his works, called him a "social documentarian" and noted that he had "a very special ability for combining composition and content while capturing his social vignettes."

Photographer Edward Steichen selected twenty of Yavno's prints for the permanent collection at New York's Museum of Modern Art in 1950, and the next year Yavno won a Guggenheim fellowship.

Books

Yavno's photographs accompanied text by newspaper columnists Herb Caen for The San Francisco Book in 1948 and  Lee Shippey  for The Los Angeles Book in 1950, both published by Houghton-Mifflin.

References

20th-century American photographers
1911 births
1985 deaths
American people of Russian descent